T9 may refer to:

Military
 M4 cannon, the 37 mm Automatic Gun, known as the T9 during development
 M22 Locust, an airborne light tank, known as the T9 during development
 German torpedo boat T9

People
 Tech N9ne (born 1971), hip hop artist
 Fernando Torres (born 1984), former footballer nicknamed "T9"

Physiology
 Thoracic vertebra 9
 Thoracic spinal nerve 9

Products
 Sony Cyber-shot DSC-T9, a digital camera
 Yepp, the Samsung YP-T9 MP3 player
 T-9, a Ford manual transmission also known as Type 9

Transportation
 Tramway T9, a tram line in Île-de-France
 Former IATA code for TransMeridian Airlines
 Former IATA code for Transcarga
 Northern Line (Sydney), a rail service numbered T9
 LSWR T9 class, a British locomotive class
 Prussian T 9, a German steam locomotive
 Van Hool T9, a line of touring buses

Other uses
 T9 (predictive text), an input technology for mobile phones
 T9, a fluorescent lamp tube format designation
 A tornado intensity rating on the TORRO scale